Governor Shoup may refer to:

George L. Shoup (1836–1904), 1st Governor of Idaho
Oliver Henry Shoup (1869–1940), 22nd Governor of Colorado